Ernst Gottfried Fischer (17 July 1754 – 27 January 1831)  was a  German chemist. He was born in Hoheneiche near Saalfeld. After studying theology and mathematics at the University of Halle, he was a teacher in Berlin before becoming Professor of Physics in 1810. He translated Claude Berthollet's publication Recherches sur les lois de l'affinitié in 1802. He proposed a system of equivalents based on sulfuric acid equal to one hundred.

Stoichiometry contribution 

Jeremias Benjamin Richter's work had little impact until 1802, when it was summarized by Fischer in terms of tables, such as the one below.

According to this table, it takes 615 parts by weight of magnesia to neutralize either 1000 parts by weight of sulfuric acid or 1405 parts by weight of nitric acid. In the early literature on the subject, these weights were referred to as combining weights.

Works

References

1754 births
1831 deaths
19th-century German chemists
18th-century German chemists